Curoba is a monotypic moth genus in the subfamily Arctiinae erected by Francis Walker in 1865. It contains the single species Curoba sangarida, first described by Caspar Stoll in 1782, which is found in southern India and Sri Lanka.

Description
Upperside: Antennae filiform and black. Thorax and abdomen chocolate, the latter edged with red. Anterior wings entirely of a dun chocolate colour, having a lemon-coloured streak crossing them from the lower corners to near the middle of the anterior edges. Posterior wings next the body almost black; the remainder carmine, with a waved black line crossing them from the upper to the abdominal corners.

Underside: Palpi grey. Breast red, with two black spots on each side. Legs grey. Wings coloured as on the upperside; the red colour on the inferior ones reaching to the body. Margins of the wings entire. Wingspan  inches (44 mm).

Taxonomy
Curoba is not a member of Arctiidae, because females have no anal glands; according to male genitalia, it is related to a noctuid subfamily Eligminae.

Gallery

References

Arctiini
Moths described in 1782
Descriptions from Illustrations of Exotic Entomology
Monotypic moth genera
Moths of Asia